Tommy Mohlin (born 25 September 1966) is a retired Swedish football defender.

References

1966 births
Living people
Swedish footballers
Degerfors IF players
Association football defenders
Allsvenskan players
Place of birth missing (living people)